Tar Creek may refer to:
 Tar Creek - a stream in Ottawa County, Oklahoma, United States
 Tar Creek - a stream in Santa Clara County, California, United States
 Tar Creek Superfund site
 Tar Creek (film)